The Fiat 124 Sport Spider is a convertible sports car marketed by Fiat for model years 1966–1985. Designed by and manufactured at the Italian carrozzeria Pininfarina factory, the monocoque, front-engined, rear-drive Sport Spider debuted at the November 1966 Turin Auto Show with styling by Tom Tjaarda.

Fiat later marketed the car as the Spider 2000 (1979–1982). After being retired by Fiat, Pininfarina continued the production of the model under its own brand as Pininfarina Spider Azzurra for the North American market and Pininfarina Spidereuropa for the European market for three more years, from August 1982 until 1985.

In 2015, a successor of the Fiat 124 Spider was presented at the Los Angeles Auto Show.

Development

The Fiat 124 Sport Spider was designed by Pininfarina and styled in-house by Tom Tjaarda. The 124 Sport Spider, 124 Sport Coupé and 124 sedan share much of their running gear, and in the case of the coupé, platforms. The Sports Spider uses a shorter platform along with a shorter wheelbase, and in contrast to the Pininfarina-styled and manufactured spider, Fiat designed and manufactured the coupé in-house.

The succession of build series of the 124 were designated internally as AS, BS, BS1, CS, and CSA. AS models had a torque tube transmitting power to the rear wheels; this crack-prone design was replaced by a trailing-arm rear axle with the second series (BS) during 1969, which was manufactured alongside the AS for the first six months of 1970. The early AS cars also have smaller taillights, while the BS received a mesh grille and black-rimmed gauges inside. In July 1970, the 1.6-liter BS1 appeared; this model is recognizable by its twin humps on the bonnet and bumper overriders. The CS series Spider arrived during 1972. Also in 1972, a sports version of the Spider debuted, required for type-approval of its rally version, and was marketed as 124 CSA (C-Spider-Abarth). In three years, Fiat manufactured less than 1000 CSA models, which were intended for sale to individual clients.

The car was manufactured by Fiat (with a Pininfarina body) in Turin until October 1981, when Pininfarina took over manufacture in their San Giorgio Canavese plant. Serial numbers started over from zero, while the 11th digit in the vehicle identification number was switched from an 8 to a 5. The Fiat Spider 2000 ended manufacture in July 1982, and after the Italian summer holidays, production of Pininfarina-badged cars commenced in its place.

Specifications

Engines
The four-cylinder engine used in the spider and coupé is a double overhead cam, aluminum crossflow head version of the sedan's pushrod unit. It started in 1966 with a capacity of 1438 cc, progressively increasing to 1608 cc in 1970 (although this was reduced to 1,592 cc in 1973), 1,756 cc in 1974, and finally 1,995 cc in 1979. The Fiat Twin Cam engine was designed by ex-Ferrari engineer Aurelio Lampredi. Bosch fuel injection replaced the previously used Weber carburetors midway through 1980. In 1981 and 1982, Fiat USA, Inc. partnered with Legend Industries to create around 700 turbo models for US markets. A supercharged model called "Volumex" also was offered toward the end of production; it was sold only in Europe, where it cost 35% more than a regular, fuel-injected Spidereuropa. This family of engines remained in production into the 1990s, giving it one of the longest production runs in automotive history. The double overhead cam (DOHC) version of the engine was the first mass manufactured DOHC to use reinforced-rubber timing belts, an innovation that came into nearly universal use in the decades after its introduction. Its derivatives powered race cars such as the Fiat 131 Mirafiori, 124 Special T, Lancia Beta Montecarlo, Delta Integrale, and many others.

Suspension
Suspension is conventional by unequal-length wishbones and coilover damper at the front and by coil-spring live rear axle at the rear, which is located by a transverse link (Panhard rod) and two pairs of forward-extending radius rods to react to braking and acceleration forces, and to control axle wind-up.

Models

North American model

The coupé and Spider were marketed in the Canada and US beginning in 1968. In 1969, the Spider featured four-wheel disc brakes, double overhead cams, hesitation wipers, steering column-mounted lighting controls, radial-ply tyres, and a five-speed manual transmission. An optional three-speed automatic transmission from General Motors was available from 1979 through 1985 for North America nd Japan. The Spider's convertible top was known for its simplicity of use—allowing a seated driver to quickly raise or lower the top. When the engine was upgraded to 2.0 L, the model was renamed the Fiat 2000 Spider. For the 1980 model year, a version with a catalytic converter and Bosch L-Jetronic fuel injection was introduced for California and optional in the other 49 states.

Fiat subsequently stopped marketing the Spider and the X1/9—to have their marketing assumed by their respective carrozzerie. In Europe, the Ritmo Cabrio was also marketed by Bertone rather than Fiat itself. In the US, Fiat turned over marketing and support of the Spider and the X1/9 to International Automobile Importers, Inc., headed by Malcolm Bricklin.

Fiat Abarth 124 Rally

The Fiat Abarth 124 Rally is a homologated version of the 124 Sport Spider, known also as "124 Abarth Stradale", introduced in November 1972.
It received Fédération Internationale de l'Automobile homologation in the special grand touring cars (group 4) racing class, and replaced the 1.6-litre Fiat Sport Spider rally cars, which were then being campaigned. At the time, 124 had already won the 1972 European Rally Championship at the hands of Raffaele Pinto and Gino Macaluso.
The 124 Rally was added to the Sport Spider range, which included the 1600 and 1800 models; the first 500 examples produced were earmarked for the domestic Italian market.

Amongst the most notable modifications over the standard Spider were independent rear suspension, engine upgrades, lightweight body panels, and a rigid hard top.

In place of the usual rear solid axle, independent suspension from lower wishbones is used, with the original trailing arms, an upper strut, and an antiroll bar. At the front, a radius rod on each side was added to the standard double wishbones.

The 9.8:1 compression ratio was left unchanged.

The transmission is the all-synchronised five-speed optional on the other Sport Spider models, and brakes are discs on all four corners.

The engine bonnet, boot lid, and fixed hard top are fibreglass, painted matt black; the rear window is perspex and the doors are aluminium. Front and rear bumpers were deleted and replaced by simple rubber bumperettes. A single matte-black wing mirror was fitted.
Matte-black wheel-arch extensions house  Pirelli CN 36 tyres on  four-spoke alloy wheels.
Inside, the centre console, rear occasional seats, and glovebox lid were eliminated; its new features were anodised aluminium dashboard trim, a small, three-spoke, leather-covered Abarth steering wheel, and Recaro corduroy-and-leather bucket seats as an extra-cost option.
The car carries Fiat badging front and rear, Abarth badges, and "Fiat Abarth" scripts on the front wings, and Abarth wheel-centre caps.
Only three paint colours were available: Corsa red, white, and light blue.

Rallying

In 1971, the 124 Spider was prepared for the World Rally Championship when Abarth became involved with its production and development. Abarth designer Ing. Colucci was responsible for getting the 124 Spider into Group 4 rally trim. Over this period, the Abarth Spider was relatively successful with wins at the 1972 Hessen Rally, Acropolis Rally, 1973 Polish Rally, 19th on the 1973 RAC rally, and seventh to mostly the Alpine Renaults on the 1973 Monte Carlo Rally. The Spider continued to perform with first, second, and third in the 1974 eighth Portuguese TAP Rally, sixth in the 1974 1000 Lakes, fourth in the 1975 Monte Carlo Rally, and also with Markku Alén driving the spider to third place. By 1976, the days of 124 rallying were numbered due to the appearance of the Fiat-Abarth 131.

Production
The Spider was sold from 1966 for European and US markets, but from 1975 until 1981, they were produced only for the US market. In 1981, they were reintroduced in Europe until the end of production in 1985. Almost 200,000 Spiders had been manufactured, with 75% for the US market. The nine models of the spider are the AS, BS, BS1, CS, CSA (Abarth), CS1, CS2, CS0, and DS.

2016

The 124 name was revived in 2016 through a joint venture with Mazda, using the new Mazda MX-5 platform. After considering possibly marketing the result as an Alfa Romeo Spider, the car was brought to the market as a Fiat. It was unveiled at the Los Angeles Auto Show in November 2015 and made available in late 2016. The engine is a turbocharged 1.4 MultiAir with 160 hp (119 kW) from the Fiat range.

References

External links

Fiat 124 Abarth Rally Gr.4 (FCA)
Pininfarina Spidereuropa (FCA)

124 Sport Spider
1960s cars
1970s cars
Cars introduced in 1966
Cars powered by longitudinal 4-cylinder engines
Rear-wheel-drive vehicles
Convertibles
1980s cars
Pininfarina vehicles